The New Adventures of Queen Victoria is a daily webcomic created by Pab Sungenis.  It uses the photo-manipulation technique popularized by Adobe Photoshop and other image editing programs to insert actual photographs and paintings of the characters into situations, instead of more conventional methods.  It was syndicated online by GoComics, a division of Andrews McMeel Universal, and has been collected into six trade paperback editions.

Publication history
The strip debuted in a discussion on a LiveJournal blog on February 8, 2006. Sungenis, who had been planning on creating a webcomic called In The Land Of Wonderful Clipart (the title was an homage to Winsor McCay's Little Nemo in Slumberland) did the first strip as a one-shot joke commenting on what he perceived as a lack of humor in the comic strip Garfield. Inspired by the humorous potential, Sungenis decided to add the strip to his own blog and keep doing it.  Eventually, he moved the strip to its own blog.

On April 5, 2006, the strip joined Comics Sherpa, an online service of Uclick.  On April 3, 2007, Uclick announced that Queen Victoria had been picked up for inclusion on its GoComics.com and MyComicsPage.com services, and began running on those services on Monday, May 21, 2007.

As of April 9, 2009, the strip has attracted more than 10,000 daily subscribers.

The strip ended on February 14, 2021; according to Sungenis, "15 years is long enough to do anything."

Cast
Main characters:
 Victoria, Queen of the United Kingdom of Great Britain and Ireland, Empress of India, and thoroughly modern monarch.
 Edward, her son and future king.

Recurring secondary characters:
 Liz, a former queen, and Victoria's best friend.
 Mary, Victoria's friend and spiritual guide.
 Maurice, a clipart image, who serves as Victoria's handyman.
 Mrs. Clipart, another clipart image, who is principal of Edward's school.
 Grandpa, Victoria's grandfather, who is quite mad.
 Anne, Liz's mother.
 Osama, a master of disguise and Victoria's self-appointed nemesis. Extremely incompetent.
 Barfly and Schrodinger, a cat-and-physicist Vaudeville act
 Fumetto dell'Arte, a "spin off" comic strip supposedly done by "Pirandello diPierdiemenico" featuring characters from the Commedia dell'arte like Arlecchino and Flavio

Style and influences
The graphic style of the strip has been compared to the animations of Terry Gilliam as seen on the television show Monty Python's Flying Circus. This same technique was used to a limited degree by Berkeley Breathed in his comic strip Bloom County, to add photographs and images of famous people to the background of the strip.

Like Gilliam's creations, which Sungenis openly acknowledges as an influence, the strip uses cut-out photographs and other images for its characters and settings. Sungenis uses the PhotoImpact program by Ulead Systems to create each strip, using a series of stock images he has collected over the years along with some artwork he himself will draw when needed. A degree of motion is sometimes portrayed by subtle tilting or shifting of characters within frames, and emotions are sometimes expressed by adding "bug-eyes" to the character photographs.

Themes and subject matter

Mainly due to its juxtaposition of historical figures into modern society and current events, the overall style of the strip tends toward absurdism, with occasional forays into postmodernism and satire.  As a quintessential 19th century figure thrown into modern society, Victoria becomes an everyman, commenting on modern pop culture. Television, movies, current celebrities, and other aspects of modern culture have been commented on and criticized in the strip.

Often, the strip comments about the comics industry itself; such as during mid-late June 2007 when the strip commented about shrinking page sizes of newspapers and the proliferation of "reruns" of comics no longer drawn such as Peanuts. Peanuts was parodied again in late October 2007, when instead of the normal strip characters an entire week of strips was devoted to an "interview" with what a middle-aged Charlie Brown might look like, discussing David Michaelis' controversial biography Schulz and Peanuts.  Part of the parody has him married to Lucy van Pelt, who henpecks him.

Politics and controversy
The strip has occasionally wandered into what could be considered political material.  When Vice President Dick Cheney accidentally shot a man during a hunting trip, Victoria went hunting with him shortly afterward.  When twenty students were suspended from a California school for viewing postings on MySpace, Edward found himself expelled for creating his own page.

In July 2007, in response to the Supreme Court's overturning of anti-segregation laws in Parents Involved in Community Schools v. Seattle School District No. 1, which Sungenis compared to overturning Brown v. Board of Education, the strip "segregated" itself into two separate strips — a "white" strip above a "black" one which was represented by showing characters and text in photo-negative on a black background.

In support of the 2007 Writers Guild of America strike, Sungenis spent a week "on strike" in November, 2007, replacing the strip's dialogue with that of classic comic strips from the late 19th and early 20th centuries like Happy Hooligan, Abie the Agent, and Buster Brown, which had fallen into the public domain.

In December 2007, the strip ran a week-long storyline criticizing the Beloit Daily News of Beloit, Wisconsin for dropping the comic strip Non Sequitur over a strip that mocked the Ku Klux Klan.  Publicity arising from Queen Victoria's mockery of the paper was one of the reasons cited by the paper's editor for the decision to return Non Sequitur to its comic pages.

Perhaps most controversially, in response to the controversy over the Jyllands-Posten cartoons depicting the prophet Muhammad, a new character was introduced into the strip based on the Virgin Mary.  Although the depiction of the character of Mary caused some backlash against the strip (one reader called it "Sacrilegious and unfunny"), Mary has since become a regular cast member.

Reception
Michael Cavna of The Washington Post called the strip one of his favorite webcomics, claiming that he is "surprised more by 'Queen Vic's' wit in a week than I am by a year's worth of 'Garfield.'"
Comics Buyer's Guide gave the third paperback collection of the strip three out of four stars, referring to it as a "brilliant webcomic" and saying that "the strips are hilarious."

The strip was chosen as Comics Coast To Coast's "Webcomic Pick Of The Week" on July 14, 2007.

Collected editions
Six paperback collections of the strip have been published:

 We Are Not Amusing , published 2006 by Lulu Publishing.
 I Can Has Empire? , published 2007 by Lulu.
 Norton Hears A Who, And Other Stories , published 2008 by Lulu.
 Suffragettes Gone Wild, published 2009 by 2,000 Monkeys With Typewriters, LLC.
 Meet The Royals, published 2010 by 2,000 Monkeys With Typewriters, LLC. (a compendium edition collecting "We Are Not Amusing", "I Can Has Empire?" and "Norton Hears a Who, And Other Stories" with extra never-before seen material)
 Real Housewives of Windsor, The, published 2011 by 2,000 Monkeys With Typewriters, LLC.

References

External links
 Official website
 The Comics Sherpa website
 GoComics website

2000s webcomics
Historical webcomics
Short form webcomics
2006 webcomic debuts
Photocomics
Parody webcomics
Satirical webcomics
Comics set in the 19th century
Comics set in the 2000s
Comics set in the 2010s
Comic strips based on real people
Cultural depictions of Queen Victoria
American comedy webcomics